Stanislas Torrents (1839-1916) was a French painter. His parents were Spanish. His paintings are in the collections of many museums, including the Musée Louis Vouland in Avignon.

References

1839 births
1916 deaths
Artists from Marseille
19th-century French painters
French people of Spanish descent
20th-century French painters